Andreas Schranz (born 2 May 1979) is an Austrian football goalkeeper who last played for SV Grödig.

Club career
Schranz played 10 years for Grazer AK and won the league title with them once, in 2004, and the domestic cup three times. In the 2004/05 Champions League preliminaries he was the goalkeeper when Grazer AK defeated Liverpool F.C. 1-0 at Anfield Road. However, Liverpool F.C. won the away leg 2-0 and later won the UEFA Champions League by beating AC Milan in the final. He left GAK in 2007 after they were demoted to the Regionalliga Mitte because of financial difficulties. He joined SK Austria Kärnten in 2007, but left them too in 2010, after the club dissolved. He signed with lower division team SV Grödig in 2011.

International career
He made his debut for Austria in an April 2004 friendly match against Luxembourg. He earned 6 caps, no goals scored. His final international match was a September 2006 friendly against Venezuela, coming on as a late substitute for striker Roland Linz after first goalkeeper Jürgen Macho was sent off.

Honours
Austrian Football Bundesliga (1):
 2003/04
Austrian Cup (3):
 1999/00, 2001/02, 2003/04

External links
Player profile - Austria Kärnten

1979 births
Living people
People from Eisenerz
Austrian footballers
Association football goalkeepers
Austria international footballers
Austrian Football Bundesliga players
Grazer AK players
FC Kärnten players
Footballers from Styria